Priče o vremenu (trans. Tales of Time) is the first studio album by Serbian heavy metal band Alogia, released in 2002.

The song "Zar sunce već zalazi" is a Serbian language cover of Conception song "Roll the Fire", and the song "Sećanje na slike iz sna" is a cover of Pretty Maids song "A Place in the Night".

The cover art was designed by the band members, Ivan Vasić and the Branković brothers, except for the Alogia logo, designed by Christophe Szpajdel.

Track listing
"Kontinuum" (S. Branković, M. Branković) - 2:10
"Mystica Aegyptiorum" (M. Branković) - 0:46
"Amon" (S. Branković, M. Branković) - 3:33
"Put u zoru života" (M. Branković) - 1:03
"Zar sunce već zalazi" (R. Khan, T. Østby, M. Branković) - 4:36
"Bajka" (S. Branković, M. Branković) - 3:27
"Lament" (M. Branković) - 4:29
"Tonem u san" (S. Branković, M. Branković) - 5:01
"Igra" (S. Branković, M. Branković) - 3:32
"Astralni horizonti" (M. Branković) - 0:52
"Sećanje na slike iz sna" (Pretty Maids, M. Branković) - 3:40
"Iznad vremena" (S. Branković, M. Branković) - 3:39
"Uvertira Solemnis" (S. Branković, M. Branković) - 1:42
"Samson" (M. Branković) - 4:15
"Gizmo" (S. Branković, M. Branković) - 5:19

Personnel
Nikola Mijić - vocals
Srđan Branković - guitar
Miroslav Branković - guitar
Ivan Vasić - bass guitar
Branislav Dabić - keyboards
Vladimir Đedović - keyboards
Damir Adžić - drums

Guest musicians
Ivica Lauš - vocals (on "Zar sunce već zalazi", "Lament" and "Samson")
Bojan Milovanović - vocals (on "Tonem u san" and "Igra")
Aleksandar Radojičić - percussion, flute (on "Gizmo")
Nemanja Plazinić - backing vocals
Ana Useinović - backing vocals

References

External links
Priče o vremenu at Discogs

Alogia (band) albums
2002 debut albums
Serbian-language albums
One Records (Serbia) albums